Cathedral of the Theotokos may refer to:

 Cathedral of the Nativity of the Theotokos (disambiguation), a list of cathedrals dedicated to the Nativity of the Mother of God
 Cathedral of the Dormition of the Theotokos (disambiguation), a list of cathedrals dedicated to the Dormition of the Mother of God

See also
 Church of the Nativity of the Theotokos (disambiguation)
 Church of the Dormition of the Theotokos (disambiguation)